Peace in the Valley is a 1963 album by Jo Stafford and Gordon MacRae.

Track listing 

 "He Bought My Soul at Calvary"
 "Somebody Bigger Than You and I"
 "I Believe"
 "All Through the Night"
 "I May Never Pass This Way Again"
 "You'll Never Walk Alone"
 "He"
 "Nearer, My God, to Thee"
 "The Lord Is My Shepherd"
 "(There'll Be) Peace in the Valley"
 "Oh! Holy Morning"
 "Shepherd Show Me How to Go"

References 

1963 albums
Jo Stafford albums
Gordon MacRae albums
Capitol Records albums
Contemporary Christian music albums by American artists